was a Japanese football player. He played for Japan national team.

Club career
Miyama was born in Hiroshima Prefecture. After graduating from Keio University, he played for his local club Rijo Shukyu-Dan. He won 1924 and 1925 Emperor's Cup with international players Naoemon Shimizu and Sachi Kagawa.

National team career
In May 1923, Miyama was selected Japan national team for 1923 Far Eastern Championship Games in Osaka. At this competition, on May 23, he debuted against Philippines. This match is Japan team first match in International A Match. Next day, he also played against Republic of China. But Japan lost in both matches (1-2, v Philippines and 1-5, v Republic of China). He played 2 games for Japan in 1923.

National team statistics

References

External links
 
 Japan National Football Team Database

Year of birth missing
Year of death missing
Keio University alumni
Association football people from Hiroshima Prefecture
Japanese footballers
Japan international footballers
Association football defenders